Yoshimune may refer to:

 Tokugawa Yoshimune (1684–1751), the eighth shōgun of the Tokugawa shogunate
 Yoshimune (anime), a 2006 anime series combines elements from Edo era and contemporary culture